Events from the year 1750 in Denmark.

Incumbents
 Monarch – Frederick V
 Prime minister – Johan Ludvig Holstein-Ledreborg

Events
 31 March  The County of Bregentved is established by Adam Gottlob Moltke from the manors of Bregentved, Turebyholm, Juellinge, Alslevgård, Tryggevælde and Sophiendal.

Births
 20 January – Princess Louise of Denmark (died 1831)
 18 December – Knud Lyne Rahbek, literary historian, critic, writer, poet, magazine editor and art administrator (died 1830)

Deaths
 23 September – Johan Conrad Ernst, architect (born 1666)
 16 October – Ernst Henrich Berling, printer and publisher, founder of Berlingske (born 1708)

References

 
1750s in Denmark
Denmark
Years of the 18th century in Denmark